The 2005 Tour Down Under was the seventh edition of the Tour Down Under stage race. It took place from 18 January to 23 January in and around Adelaide, South Australia. This particular edition was won by Luis León Sánchez, who rode for the Liberty Seguros–Würth

Stages

Stage 1
18 January 2005 – Adelaide – Adelaide, 50 km 

Stage and General Classification after Stage 1

Stage 2
19 January 2005 – Salisbury to Tanunda, 150 km

Stage 2 result

Stage 3
20 January 2005 – Glenelg to Victor Harbor, 139 km

Stage 3 result

Stage 4
21 January 2005 – Unley to Hahndorf, 152 km

Stage 4 result

Stage 5
22 January 2005 – Willunga to Willunga, 147 km

Stage 5 result

Stage 6
23 January 2005 – Adelaide to Adelaide, 81 km

Stage 6 result

Final standings

General classification

Points Classification

King of the Mountains classification

Young Riders' classification

References

Tour Down Under
Tour Down Under
Tour Down Under
2005 in Oceanian sport
January 2005 sports events in Australia